José de Orejón y Aparicio (Huacho 1706?-Lima, May 1765), was a Puruvian composer. He was organist at Lima Cathedral. He studied in Lima, first with Tomás de Torrejón y Velasco, and then with Roque Ceruti.

Recordings
"Ya que el sol misterioso", Valentina Alvarez (soprano) Urtext Records
Ah, de la esfera de Apolo : "Ah, de la esfera de Apolo", A del Día, Our Lady of Copacabana Jilguerillo sonoro Tocatta - Al post Comunio Xácara - Según veo el Aparato Dolores y Gozos de San Joseph: Chacona - Giga Musica Temprana. Cobra Records 2017

References

1706 births
1756 deaths
18th-century composers
Male organists
Peruvian male composers